Lalangina is a district of Haute Matsiatra in Madagascar.

Communes
The district is further divided into 13 communes:

 Alakamisy Ambohimaha
 Alatsinainy Ialamarina
 Ambalakely
 Ambalamahasoa
 Andrainjato Centre
 Andrainjato Est
 Androy, Fianarantsoa
 Fandrandava
 Ialananindro
 Ivoamba
 Mahatsinjony
 Sahambavy
 Taindambo

References 

Districts of Haute Matsiatra